Phāgun (Nepali:फागुन) is the eleventh month in the Bikram Samwat, the official Nepali calendar. This month coincides with February 13 to March 13 of the Western calendar and is 29 days long.

Important Events during this month:
February 16: Phāgun 4, Maha Shivaratri
March 3 and 4: Phāgun 19 and 20, Phāgu Purnima

References
Nepali Calendar 

Nepali calendar